The 1922 North Carolina Tar Heels football team represented the University of North Carolina in the 1922 college football season. Led by second year head coaches Bob Fetzer and Bill Fetzer, the team compiled a record of 9–1 and tied for the Southern Conference (SoCon) championship. The team's quarterback was Monk McDonald.

Schedule

References

North Carolina
North Carolina Tar Heels football seasons
North Carolina Tar Heels football